Heather Anne Campbell is an American writer, comedienne, improv comedy performer, voice actress, and actress.

Life and career
Born in Chicago, Illinois, Campbell began studying improvisational comedy at iO Theater at the age of fifteen, under the tutelage of Del Close. Following a four-year stint of performing in Northwestern University's Mee-Ow Show, she relocated to Amsterdam in 2002 for three years as part of the comedy group Boom Chicago. In 2005, Campbell moved to Los Angeles and found work with multiple comedy clubs such as The Groundlings and the Upright Citizens Brigade Theater.

Campbell is an alumna of The Midnight Show, a monthly sketch showcase at the Upright Citizens Brigade Theater, and is a recurring performer on The CW's Whose Line Is It Anyway. Campbell was also a writer on Cartoon Network's Incredible Crew. In 2013, she began writing for Adult Swim's The Eric Andre Show. She has also written for Fox's Animation Domination, and is a voice talent behind various short clips on Fox's Animation Domination High-Def (ADHD). She was a recurring guest on Comedy Central's @midnight.

Campbell appeared on MADtv and was the featured singer in Improv Everywhere's Food Court Musical.

In 2009, Campbell played a featured character named "Pink" in the web series MegaBot.

In September 2010, Campbell was hired as a writer for Season 36 of Saturday Night Live. In March 2011, Campbell appeared in Drew Carey's Improv-A-Ganza, a shortform improv show that aired on GSN.

Campbell has also appeared in commercials for CiCi's Pizza, Wendy's, Toyota, and was featured in Activision's "Mapathy" campaign for the video game Call of Duty: Modern Warfare 2. She has written several viral internet videos for The Midnight Show, including "Twilight with Cheeseburgers", "Bavatar", and "Drive Recklessly", which was nominated for The Comedy Awards on Comedy Central in 2012.

Campbell's photography has been selected by National Geographic as Photo of the Day, and her poster design work was featured as the back cover of Adbusters.

In addition, Campbell is also a video game journalist, and was editor of Dave Halverson's Play Magazine as well as Jeff Bond's Geek Monthly until their closure in 2010. Formerly, Campbell was also the Executive Editor of Fusion Publishing's Rocket Magazine, in addition to being a freelance contributor for Edge Online, Action Button, and EGM.
She has written or co-written three episodes of the 2019 Twilight Zone series. Campbell was also hired as a writer for the sixth season of Adult Swim's Rick and Morty. 

In June 2019, Campbell began co-hosting Get Played (formerly How Did This Get Played?), a podcast focused on unusual or poorly rated video games. In June 2022, Campbell began co-hosting spin-off podcast Get Anime'd!, with Get Played co-hosts Nick Wiger and Matt Apodaca.

Though once a libertarian, she has since renounced that political label.

Personal life
In October 2018, she came out on Instagram as part of National Coming Out Day. She is engaged to screenwriter and playwright Mary Laws.

Filmography

Film

Television

Podcasts

Video games

See also

List of Whose Line Is It Anyway? performers

References

External links

 Official website
 

Living people
American television actresses
American women comedians
American freelance journalists
Actresses from Chicago
Comedians from Illinois
Upright Citizens Brigade Theater performers
LGBT actresses
American LGBT comedians
American women non-fiction writers
Year of birth missing (living people)
21st-century American women
American LGBT actors